James Guarantano is a former American football wide receiver for the NFL's San Diego Chargers and the CFL's Baltimore Stallions. He was also a former standout wide receiver while playing college football at Rutgers University.

Raised in Lodi, New Jersey, Guaranto played prep football at Lodi High School.

College career
Guarantano played for Rutgers from 1989-92.

In the 1991 season, Guarantano collected 740 yards, on 62 receptions, which was tops in the Big East. That was highlighted by a game against Temple on November 17, 1991, when Rutgers clinched its first winning season in four years. Guarantano caught a 70-yard touchdown pass, allowing the Scarlet Knights to finish with a 6-5 record, their first winning season since going 6-5 in 1987. Following the season, he was named to the All Big East Second-team.

Guarantano would follow that up in 1992 with 56 receptions for 755 yards (13.5 yards per catch) and six touchdowns. One of those touchdowns came in a dramatic victory over Pittsburgh on September 18, 1992. Guarantano caught a 33-yard score to send Rutgers to a 7-0 halftime lead, and Rutgers would go on to win 21-16. For his efforts, Guarantano was named to the All Big East First-team, and was a UPI Honorable Mention All American.

College legacy
When Guaranto graduated in 1992, he left as one of the most prolific receivers in school history. Guarantano was second All-Time in Scarlet Knight history in yards (2,065), first in receptions (158) and third in touchdowns (11). In 1999, he was inducted into the Rutgers football Hall of Fame.

Professional career

Guarantano discussed a possible contract with the New York Giants before he signed as an undrafted free agent with the San Diego Chargers on April 30, 1993. He was released on May 5, 1993. Following his stint in the NFL, Guarantano would play for the Baltimore Stallions of the CFL from 1994-1997.

Personal

Following his professional football career, Guarantano became a police officer in the NYPD. Guarantano's son, Jarrett Guarantano, was one of the top quarterbacks in New Jersey's 2016 high school class, and is a former starting QB at the University of Tennessee before transferring to Washington State. He chose the Vols over Rutgers University, his dad's alma mater, and Ohio State University

References

External links
 Lodi HS Famous Alumni - James Guarantano

Living people
American football wide receivers
Lodi High School (New Jersey) alumni
People from Lodi, New Jersey
Players of American football from New Jersey
Rutgers Scarlet Knights football players
San Diego Chargers players
Baltimore Stallions players
Sportspeople from Bergen County, New Jersey
Year of birth missing (living people)